The 1992 Australian Drivers' Championship was a CAMS sanctioned motor racing title for drivers of Formula Brabham racing cars. The winner of the title, which was the 36th Australian Drivers' Championship, was awarded the 1992 CAMS Gold Star. Due to a sponsorship deal with beer brand Tooheys, the championship was promoted as the "Tooheys Australian Drivers' Championship".

Calendar
The championship was contested over a five-round series with one race per round.
 Round 1, Sandown, Victoria, 3 March
 Round 2, Symmons Plains, Tasmania, 15 March
 Round 3, Winton, Victoria, 4 April
 Round 4, Eastern Creek, New South Wales, 24 may
 Round 5, Oran Park, New South Wales, 21 June

Points system
Championship points were awarded on a 20–15–12–10–8–6–4–3–2–1 basis to the first ten finishers in each round.

Results

Notes and references

Further reading
 The Mark of a Champion, Australian Motor Racing Year, 1992/93, pages 155-167

External links
 Formula Brabham images – 1992 Retrieved from www.autopics.com.au on 3 November 2009

Australian Drivers' Championship
Drivers' Championship
Formula Holden